Etlingera brevilabrum is a monocotyledonous plant species that was first described by Theodoric Valeton, and given its current name by Rosemary Margaret Smith. Etlingera brevilabrum is part of the genus Etlingera and the family Zingiberaceae. No subspecies are listed in the Catalog of Life.

References 

brevilabrum
Taxa named by Rosemary Margaret Smith